The Social Liberal Movement (SLB; , MSL; , MSL) is a social conservative party in Switzerland.  Founded in 2011, the SLB has one member of the National Council.

The party was founded by Samuel Schmid on 23 April 2011.  Schmid, a member of the Grand Council of Aargau originally elected for the right-wing Federal Democratic Union, was joined in June 2011 by Ricardo Lumengo, a member of the National Council originally elected for the centre-left Social Democratic Party.

The party has branches in Aargau, Bern, and Zurich, and claims to have hundreds of members.

The party failed to have any representatives elected at the 2011 federal election: winning 0.5% of the vote in Aargau and 0.3% of the vote in Bern.

Footnotes

External links
  Social Liberal Movement official website in German
  Social Liberal Movement official website in French

Political parties in Switzerland
Political parties established in 2011
2011 establishments in Switzerland